The Faringdon Sand is a geologic formation in England. It preserves fossils dating back to the Cretaceous period.

See also

 List of fossiliferous stratigraphic units in England

References 

Cretaceous England
Aptian Stage
Lower Cretaceous Series of Europe